Persicaria minor is species of herb in the family Polygonaceae. Common names include pygmy smartweed, small water pepper and swamp willow weed. This herb is native to Asia, but distributed widely in Europe and Australia. It is used in South East Asian cooking.

Description
Persicaria minor is native to South East Asia, including Malaysia, Thailand, Vietnam and Indonesia. It grows wild in cooler highlands, but is also found in wet lowland areas near rivers, ditches, and canals. It is a creeping plant with slender stems, and grows upright to a height of 1 to 1.5 meters. The creeping stem is green with reddish tinge, is cylindrical in shape, and has short nodes about 9 mm apart. Its leaves are long and narrowly-tapering, alternately arranged, and green with short, reddish petioles. Its flowers are minute, pale violet, and are 12 to 15 cm long.

Uses
Persicaria minor is an edible herb. In Malaysia where it has the common name "kesum", the shoots and young leaves are eaten raw as part of salad (ulam); used as an aroma spice additive in peppery dishes such as laksa, nasi kerabu, asam pedas and tom yam; used as tea leaves; and used for topical applications. Its oil has been used for aromatherapy and in treatments for dandruff.

In Malaysian traditional medicine, P. minor has been used in post-natal tonics and for treatment of digestion.

Pharmacological studies on P. minor have indicated anti-oxidant, LDL oxidation, anti-inflammatory and anti-microbial activities, digestive enhancing and anti-ulcer activities, cognitive enhancing activities, and as a microbial inhibitor to prevent food spoilage. Comparative studies have been carried out to analyse the metabolites not only in the plant's leaves, but also in its stem and roots. Clinical studies have also been carried out on this plant, looking at its supposed cognitive indications.

Compared with other four Malaysian herbs (Cosmos caudatus, Piper sarmentosum, Centella asiatica, Syzygium polyanthum), the Persicaria minor showed the highest concentration of phenols and the highest antioxidant activity. It has been used as a bioactive component for packaging film for edible foods, based on a semi-refined carrageenan and glycerol as plasticizers.

References

External links

 Polygonum minus, Plants for a Future

minor
Flora of Europe
Flora of temperate Asia
Herbs
Medicinal plants